Bugunda is a rural locality (a settlement) in Bauntovsky District, Republic of Buryatia, Russia. The population was 20 as of 2010. There is 1 street.

Geography 
Bugunda is located 85 km southeast of Bagdarin (the district's administrative centre) by road.

References 

Rural localities in Bauntovsky District